Fightin' Words is the second studio album by American rapper Diabolic. After several delays and the subsequent abandonment of Viper Records due to Diabolic's desire to retain creative control over his productions, it was announced that the album would be released by his newly formed WarHorse Records on September 16, 2014. Features include Vinnie Paz, Sean Price, Celph Titled, Apathy, R.A. the Rugged Man and more. The album contains productions from DJ Premier, Engineer, Junior Makhno, Snowgoons and more.

Track listing

References

2014 albums
Albums produced by DJ Premier
Diabolic (rapper) albums